Gabriele Kohlisch (born 7 December 1963) is a German luger and bobsledder who competed from the mid-1980s to 1997 in luge, then from 1998 to the early 2000s in bobsleigh. She is one of only two people to win World Championship gold medals in both bobsledding and luge, the other being fellow German Susi Erdmann.

She was born in Karl-Marx-Stadt (modern Chemnitz) and initially competed for East Germany.

Luge career
Kohlisch won ten medals at the FIL World Luge Championships, including six golds (Women's singles: 1990, 1995; Mixed team: 1990, 1991, 1993, 1995) and four silvers (Women's singles: 1987, 1991, 1993; Mixed team: 1996). She also won three medals at the FIL European Luge Championships, including two silvers (Women's singles: 1996; Mixed team: 1994) and one bronze (Women's singles: 1994). Kohlisch competed in two Winter Olympics for the reunified Germany in the women's singles event, finishing sixth in both 1992 and 1994. Kohilsch retired from luge in 1997, mainly to the competitiveness among her fellow German teammates, most notably Jana Bode, Erdmann, Silke Kraushaar, Barbara Niedernhuber, and Sylke Otto. She won the Luge World Cup overall title in women's singles in 1993-4.

Bobsleigh career
Kohlisch switched to bobsleigh in 1998, competing at the FIBT World Championships. She won the gold medal in the debut two-woman event at the 2000 FIBT World Championships in Winterberg, Germany. She tried out for the German bobsleigh team to compete at the 2002 Winter Olympics in Salt Lake City, but finished third behind Erdmann and Sandra Prokoff (Sandra Kiriasis since late 2004).

Other activities
Kohlisch now serves as a spokesperson for the International Luge Federation and has served as a spokesperson for the German luge team since the 1998 Winter Olympics in Nagano.

She is also responsible for physical education at Naval Academy Mürwik (Marineschule Mürwik), the German Naval Academy in Flensburg-Mürwik, Germany.

References
1992 luge women's singles results
1994 luge women's singles results
1997 announcement of Kohlisch's retirement from luge 
Bobsleigh two-woman world championship medalists since 2000
Hickok sports information on World champions in luge and skeleton.
List of European luge champions 
List of women's singles luge World Cup champions since 1978.
Sports 123 results on World champions in 2-Woman bobsleigh
SportQuick.com information on World champions in luge 

1963 births
Living people
Sportspeople from Chemnitz
German female bobsledders
German female lugers
Lugers at the 1992 Winter Olympics
Lugers at the 1994 Winter Olympics
Olympic lugers of Germany
20th-century German women